Jasper Township is an inactive township in Jasper County, in the U.S. state of Missouri.

Jasper Township takes its name from the county in which it is located.

References

Townships in Missouri
Townships in Jasper County, Missouri